Meverell Locke Van Doren (October 14, 1845 – August 29, 1917) was an American politician who served in the Virginia House of Delegates. He was married to Lucy Minor Maury, the youngest daughter of Matthew Fontaine Maury.

References

External links 

1845 births
1917 deaths
Democratic Party members of the Virginia House of Delegates
19th-century American politicians